Lesley McKenzie (born December 23, 1980) is a Canadian rugby union player with 25 caps and the coach of the Japan women's national rugby union team. She played in the 2006 and 2010 Women's Rugby World Cup.

Rugby career 
During university, McKenzie played for five years with the UBC Thunderbirds. She played club rugby for Meraloma and UBCOB Ravens.

McKenzie earned her first senior cap with the Canada women's national rugby team at the 2004 Churchill Cup versus the United States women's national rugby team. Previously, she played for the under 23 representative team and represented British Columbia as a senior.

In 2008, McKenzie played rugby in New Zealand as preparation for the 2010 World Cup.

She joined the UBC Thunderbirds as head coach in 2008 and left her post in 2013. Kim Donaldson was her assistant coach from 2009 to 2011 Maria Gallo was her assistant coach from 2011 to 2013. In 2012, McKenzie led the Canada women's FISU 7s team to France.

In 2014, McKenzie was the Wellington Rugby Football Union's girls development co-coordinator.

From 2015 to 2015, McKenzie developed and delivered programs as a game development officer for the Wanganui Rugby Football Union. In 2018, McKenzie immigrated to Japan to become an assistant coach for the Japan women's national rugby sevens team. Prior to this, she was hired five times for two weeks as a part-time resource coach for the Japanese sevens team. As assistant coach, McKenzie is also involved in academy branches across Japan. In January 2019, McKenzie was appointed head coach of the fifteen-a-side team. This role also includes the responsibility of proactively encouraging and promoting women players to become coaches.

References 

1980 births
Living people
Canadian female rugby union players
Canada women's international rugby union players
Female rugby sevens players
UBC Thunderbirds players
Sportspeople from British Columbia
University of British Columbia alumni